Qaleh Juq (also Romanized as Qal‘eh Jūq) is a village in Oryad Rural District, in the Central District of Mahneshan County, Zanjan Province, Iran. At the 2006 census, its population was 52, in 11 families.

References 

Populated places in Mahneshan County